Rain World is a 2017 survival platform game developed by Videocult and published by Adult Swim Games for PlayStation 4 and Microsoft Windows in March 2017, and for Nintendo Switch in late 2018. Players assume control of the "slugcat", an elongated felid-like creature, and are tasked with survival in a derelict and hostile world. 

The game features a simulated ecosystem. The slugcat uses debris as weapons to escape enemies, forage for food, and reach safe hibernation rooms before a deadly torrential rain arrives. The player is given little explicit guidance on how to survive, which was the intention of the developers, who wanted players to feel like a rat living on subway tracks, in which they learn to survive in an environment without grasping its higher-level function.

Rain World received mixed reviews from critics, who praised its art design and fluid animations, but criticized its brutal difficulty, inconsistent save points, and imprecise controls. Some of these criticisms were addressed with later updates.

In January 2023, a downloadable content pack titled Rain World: Downpour was released for PC. Release is expected for Switch, PS4, and Xbox as well.

Gameplay 

The player's character, referred to as a "slugcat", uses spears and rocks to survive in a hostile, ruined, and obtuse 2D world. The player is given little explicit guidance and is free to explore the world in any direction via pipes and passages that pass through over 1600 static screens, each with enemies that spawn in set locations and can then move from screen to screen. The slugcat can jump, swim, and climb poles to avoid enemies while foraging for sparse food, which is used to hibernate in scarce, designated safe rooms. Hibernation resets the day cycle and saves the player's progress. If the player does not reach the hibernation point before the end of the day cycle, a crushing rain will pour, flooding the world and ensuring the slugcat dies through drowning or being pummeled by the rains. However, if the slugcat has not eaten sufficient food, it will not be allowed to hibernate normally. Instead it will wake up in starvation mode, where it becomes sluggish and faints often. Unless it eats enough food to fill up the hunger bar, it will not return to normal and will starve to death once the cycle ends through hibernation.

Upon death, the slugcat returns to the last hibernation save point. The player also loses a karma point, which are indicated at the bottom of the screen. Karma is gained upon successfully hibernating, and the player can shield their current karma level by eating a yellow flower. The flower appears at the start of each area and is re-planted wherever the slugcat dies. The player needs to meet a karmic threshold to reach specific areas of the game.

Enemies range from camouflaged plants to large vultures to Komodo dragon-like lizards and large aquatic creatures. Many enemies can kill the slugcat in one hit, and some species have different variations, such as the many types of lizards, all with unique abilities. The enemies spawn from set dens and can then move freely throughout rooms, meaning the player is faced with problems that they sometimes cannot avoid. Enemies possess dynamic AI and exist in the game's world perpetually, even when not on the same screen as the player. Players are expected to mainly evade the enemies, but they do need to experiment with spears to climb walls and knock fruit off of vines. It is possible to kill enemies through the use of prolonged attacks, though attacking them is mainly used as a way to ward them off. However, this becomes more of a requirement in the base game's hardest campaign, Hunter, where the slugcat is a carnivore and must eat the flesh of other creatures to hibernate. The slugcat, if holding an object in each hand, can swap their places by pressing the grab button twice. It can also eat power-up plants, which grant status effects, such as slowing time.

Rain World setting is destroyed by ecological catastrophe and illustrated in pixel art. Its story is communicated through details in the environment, images during hibernation, and holograms from a worm-like creature that monitors the slugcat, more commonly known as an overseer. The game offers little to guide the player, apart from the overseer, who gives some hints about where to go and what to collect towards the beginning of the game. The player can view a map to check their progress through the large in-game world.

The player can choose between two campaigns at the outset: Monk and Survivor. As Monk, creatures are less inclined to be aggressive and food is more plentiful. Beating either Monk or Survivor unlocks a third character, Hunter, with a difficult campaign featuring more powerful and hostile creatures. Monk and Hunter were added in the 1.5 update, and Monk was created to address concerns about the game's difficulty. The 1.5 update also added a local multiplayer arena mode, and a sandbox mode where players can spawn in objects and creatures from the game.

The Downpour expansion adds five new campaigns and enables local multiplayer for story modes. Each campaign features a new slugcat with new abilities. Spearmaster can create spears but must eat by attacking creatures, Rivulet is faster but has shorter day cycles, Gourmand has access to a crafting system, Artificer can double jump and create explosives, and Saint has a grappling tongue but is unable to throw spears. Downpour also adds three new game modes: Safari mode lets players freely observe the world or control any living creature within it, Challenge mode provides 70 scored challenges, and Expedition is a semi-roguelike mode with random missions that award perks upon completion. Downpour'''s release was accompanied by the free Rain World Remix upgrade, which added accessibility options and ways to customize game difficulty.

 Plot 

The Monk and Survivor campaigns share a similar plot. When a group of slugcats crosses a river in the rain, the Survivor slips off a pipe and falls, becoming separated from the others. The Monk is the Survivor's sibling. Regardless of which character is chosen, the slugcat wakes up alone to explore the abandoned world.

Eventually it reaches Five Pebbles, a massive decaying supercomputer, and meets the AI's robotic avatar. Five Pebbles explains that like all creatures, the slugcat is trapped in a stagnant cycle of death and rebirth and wants it to end. He then directs it to a place where it can free itself from the "great cycle". Following his guidance, the slugcat travels to an underground chasm and enters a sea of "Void Fluid", which helps it ascend.

More information about the setting can be obtained by bringing pearls to a damaged robot named Looks to the Moon. She explains that the ancient civilization that once inhabited the world sought to escape the eternal cycle and succeeded, collectively ascending from existence. She and Five Pebbles are "iterators", AIs created by the ancients to calculate a way for every living organism to ascend. Iterators use vast quantities of water, causing the rain.

The iterators decay over time, but since the cycle of rebirth exists, they will live forever and the ancients expected them to eventually find a solution. Five Pebbles rejected this purpose and tried to overwrite a self-destruction taboo with excess intake of water, damaging Looks to the Moon to the point of nonfunctionality.

The Hunter campaign chronologically takes place before the Survivor and Monk campaigns. As Hunter, the player starts with a pearl and a green artifact containing "slag reset keys". The Hunter delivers the slag reset keys to Looks to the Moon, partially revitalizing her after the damage caused by Five Pebbles. If the Hunter gives Moon the pearl as well, its message reveals that a third iterator, No Significant Harassment, sent the Hunter to help her.

 Development 

Prior to creating Rain World, Joar Jakobsson was a graphic designer in Sweden who taught himself how to animate sprites. He had played few games and had little industry experience when development began in 2011. He began with a sketch of an elongated cat, which was named "slugcat" by one of his YouTube viewers, though the character has no official name. Jakobsson had previous interest in derelict environments, and what they reveal about the humans who previously occupied them. Partly inspired by his feelings of foreignness while living as an exchange student in Seoul, South Korea, a core idea in the game's development was to recreate the life of "the rat in Manhattan". This rat understands how to find food, hide, and live in the subway, but does not understand the subway's structuring purpose or why it was built. Jakobsson and his development partner, James Primate, hoped that players would similarly feel as if they were close to making sense of the game's abstraction of an industrial environment without fully understanding. Jakobsson designed Rain World enemies to live their own lives, in which they hunt for food and struggle to survive, rather than serve as obstacles for the player. Enemy placements are randomly generated, and in final playtests a week prior to release, the developers noted how some players became more or less interested in the game based on the luck of their enemy spawns. The developers expected players to learn to avoid combat and play the game primarily through stealth and flight.

Jakobsson served as the game's artist, designer, and programmer. His levels are made by hand in a standalone level editor. The designer brushes recurring, cloned elements, such as plants and chains, onto the map. The software combines and processes to add shadow. At one point, Rain World included a multiplayer mode, and separate story and custom modes. The development team successfully crowdfunded some development costs via Kickstarter in early 2014. By early 2015, about four years into development, the team had switched to the Unity game engine and released a test version of the game to its Kickstarter backers.

 Music 
Primate, who is also known as James Therrien, wrote Rain World soundtrack, handled the indie studio's business, and designed levels. Primate first found the game on an indie game Internet forum and sent Jakobsson 12 tracks as a successful pitch. He originally composed a chiptune-style soundtrack with his musician partner Lydia Esrig, but turned to field recordings of litter for otherworldly sounds. Rain World music is low-fi and electronic. Primate wanted the music to approximate the game's eclectic visuals, which mix industrial, science fiction, jungle, and various architectural elements. In lieu of traditional character dialogue and narration, Rain World story was partly communicated through its soundtrack. The early game sound is primitive and based on the slugcat's feelings of fear and hunger, and eventually builds to describe new areas. Rain World has over 3.5 hours of recorded music across 160 tracks. At any given time, between eight and twelve tracks will simultaneously layer to create ambiance and respond to the slugcat's in-game context. In December 2018, a vinyl edition of the soundtrack was released by Limited Run Games.

 Release 
The team announced that it was in the last phases of development in early 2016. Animations from Rain World were popularized on social media in praise of their "uncanny fluidity". The game was developed by Videocult, published by Adult Swim Games, and released for PlayStation 4 and Windows on March 28, 2017. Previews compared Rain World to predecessors, including the difficulty of Super Meat Boy, the soundtrack of Fez, and the puzzle-platforming to Metroid and Oddworld.

After release, Videocult announced a series of major content updates, which were planned for release later in 2017. Slated features included local multi-player functionality, featuring over 50 new rooms; and two alternative slugcats, which make the game easier and harder respectively.  Subsequently, the '1.5' patch, which contained all of those features, was released on December 11, 2017. An additional "1.7" update in late 2018 added two new play modes that either increase or decrease the gameplay's intensity. This release also brought the multiplayer feature to PlayStation.

In 2018, Videocult and Adult Swim Games released Rain World for the Nintendo Switch platform in December 13, 2018. Limited Run Games released a physical edition of Rain World for the PlayStation 4 later that month.

In January 2022, Videocult announced that due to publisher issues with Adult Swim Games, Rain World was now being published by Akupara Games after a prolonged legal dispute. On March 28, 2022, the first DLC was officially announced, to be published by Akupara. Named "Rain World: Downpour", it contains five new slugcat characters with their own campaigns, over 1000 new rooms across ten new regions, and three new game modes. Downpour is an expansion of the "More Slugcats" mod and was developed in collaboration with several community modders. It released for PC on January 19, 2023, while console release dates remain unannounced.

 Reception 

The game, before reaching cult status, received mixed reviews on its release, according to video game review aggregator Metacritic. Reviewers praised the game's art design and criticized the harshness of its gameplay mechanics, particularly its unpredictable deaths, ruthless enemies, and time-consuming hibernation requirements. Eurogamer compared its savage, survival elements to Tokyo Jungle.Rain World punishing gameplay frustrated reviewers, who often descended into apathy. Considering the random enemy spawns, one-hit kills, infrequent game saves, frequent repetition, crushing rain, some inexplicable enemy movements, and sometimes clumsy controls, IGN wrote that any of the game's challenging elements taken alone would be "tough but fair", but when considered together, "the odds are stacked so high against the player that it risks toppling the entire structure of the game". Reviewers were bored by the repeated navigation of rooms with random enemies after each death, which tempered their strong urge to explore. Polygon reviewer was miserable following the loss of her multi-hour progression. She wrote about futility as a central tenet of Rain World, and felt that she was not given the proper tools to survive. Reviewers lamented, in particular, how the slugcat's jerky animations and imprecise throwing mechanics led to many unwarranted deaths. Multiple reviewers concluded that while some hardcore players might enjoy the tough gameplay, Rain World excluded a large audience with its design choices, as its choice of emergent enemy strategy would feel unfair to most players. Rock, Paper, Shotgun called the game's checkpointing among the worst in modern platformers, and its challenge, unlike the similarly punishing Dark Souls, without purpose. Rain World karmic gates, which require players to have a positive hibernate to death ratio, were arbitrary goals "disrespectful" of the player's time, according to GameSpot. Making players trudge through an area a dozen times, IGN argued, is "antithetical" in a game in which exploration itself is the reward. PC Gamer reviewer, with time, began to see Rain World cumbersome controls less as "bad design" than as "thematically appropriate", given the game's intent to disempower the player.

Some reviewers fondly recalled serendipitous in-game encounters as they learned the game environment's unwritten rules. Not knowing how foreign figures would react, Rock, Paper, Shotgun reviewer treated new encounters as puzzles. This experimentation led to moments of fearful scrambling across a room to avoid a new, encroaching enemy type, and discovering that other enemies that are harmless if left alone. Rain World was abundant with opportunities for a player to demonstrate ingenuity and improvisation, according to GameSpot reviewer, whose highlights included making a mouse into a dark room's lantern, using weapons as climbable objects, and luring enemies into battle to distract from the slugcat's presence. Those critics considered these mysterious, perceptive interactions to be among the game's best features, though far outweighed by Rain World punishing game mechanics.

During development, Rain World animations became popular on social media for their "uncanny fluidity", which reviewers continued to praise at release. IGN described slugcat's animations as beautiful and reactive to the angle and physics of movement, from clinging to poles to squeezing through ventilation. The reviewer said it was among the best aesthetics in a 2D game, with each screen showing abundant detail and meticulous craft. The graphics were more interesting than beautiful to Polygon reviewer, who also praised the limited color palette's role in distinguishing the slugcat, prey, and enemies from the environment. While some journalists compared the game's aesthetic to that of Limbo, Rock, Paper, Shotgun reviewer felt that Rain World had more in common with Oddworld: Abe's Oddysee aesthetic: both featured similarly dark yet attractive worlds, scary yet fascinating characters, frequent inter-enemy conflict, and frustrating or masochistic controls. Oddworld, though, had more frequent saves. Rain World successfully depicted "the cruel indifference of nature", according to GameSpot. Its imaginative and compelling landscapesurreal inhabitants in a bleak, alien atmosphererecalled the spirit of games like BioShock and Abzû, in which the reviewer was too attracted to the artistic detail to contemplate the credulity of the man-made environment.

Accolades
The game was nominated for "Best Platformer" in PC Gamer''s 2017 Game of the Year Awards, and also for "Best Platformer", "Best Art Direction", and "Most Innovative" in IGN's Best of 2017 Awards.  It was also nominated for the Statue of Liberty Award for Best World at the New York Game Awards 2018, and for "Excellence in Audio" at the Independent Games Festival Competition Awards.

References

External links 

 

2017 video games
Adult Swim games
Crowdfunded video games
Indie video games
Kickstarter-funded video games
Nintendo Switch games
Multiplayer and single-player video games
Platform games
PlayStation 4 games
Video games about cats
Video games developed in the United States
Windows games
Survival video games
Akupara Games games